Imperial Group Pension Trust Ltd v Imperial Tobacco Ltd [1991] 1 WLR 589 is an English trust law case, especially relevant for UK labour law and UK company law, concerning pension funds and the implementation of a poison pill.

Facts
The Imperial Tobacco pension trust committee asked the court whether the wording of rule 64A of the pension scheme could be varied with the company management’s consent. This said that members’ benefits ‘shall be increased by at least the lesser of’ 5% pa or the Retail Price Index. That provision was introduced following an amendment under rule 36 that said the committee could make an amendment following the company management’s consent. Imperial Tobacco had been taken over by Hanson Trust plc, and the rule 64A was introduced as an apparent poison pill, because the previous position was that employees’ pensions were only updated ad hoc and usually below inflation. This accompanied the automatic closure of the existing scheme to new entrants. But the takeover succeeded in 1986. By then, inflation had increased above 5%, and so the committee asked management if they would update pensions over 5%. The new management refused, and offered instead a new scheme of the lesser of 15% pa or RPI updates. Employees holding entitlements to the old scheme, if they transferred, would take their aliquot share, including surpluses (there was an estimated £130m at the time). However, the catch in the new scheme was that any surplus would go to the company, not the employees’ themselves. The trust alleged that, if the committee did have to obtain management’s consent to update the entitlements to keep pace with inflation, the offer given was a breach of a duty of good faith because it was compelling employees to forgo their acquired rights.

Judgment
Sir Nicolas Browne-Wilkinson VC held that rule 64A could not be construed as allowing the committee to make increases without management’s consent. However, the company management could not use its discretion to withhold its consent in a way that undermined good faith, and mutual trust and confidence. The company management was not exercising a fiduciary power, and so it could take its own interests, including financial burdens, into account, but it still had to exercise its power for a proper purpose. A collateral purpose of coercing members to relinquish their accrued rights for the company to benefit from the surplus, was bad faith. His judgment on the nature of the pension obligations read as follows.

See also

UK company law
English trust law
The Achilleas
Wallace v. United Grain Growers Ltd. [1997] 3 SCR 701

Notes

References

English trusts case law
Imperial Brands
Tobacco case law
High Court of Justice cases
1991 in case law
1991 in British law